William Batt may refer to:

William Batt (architect) (1840–1910), architect based in Belfast
William Batt (doctor) (1744–1812), English doctor and author
William Loren Batt (1882–1964), American mechanical engineer

See also
Batt (surname)